"Rebel Run" is a song by the English new wave band Toyah, fronted by Toyah Willcox. It was released in 1983 to promote the album Love Is the Law and was a Top 30 chart success in the UK.

Background
The track was written by Toyah Willcox and Simon Darlow, and produced by Nick Tauber. It was the lead single from Love Is the Law and reached number 24 on the UK Singles Chart, spending a total of five weeks on the chart. Toyah appeared on several television programmes to promote the song, including an outdoor performance filmed at Alton Towers for the TV show Hold Tight, when the band also performed "Ieya". The 7" single B-side was "To the Mountains High", and the 12" single featured an additional song, "Baptised in Fire". Both of these tracks appeared on the 2005 reissue of Love Is the Law, as well as the compilation album The Safari Singles Collection Part 2: 1981–1983, released the same year.

Music video
The song's music video pictures Toyah as a character in a video game, wearing an outfit based on American football.

Track listing
 7" single
A. "Rebel Run" (Toyah Willcox, Simon Darlow) – 3:13
B. "To the Mountains High" (Willcox, Joel Bogen, Darlow) – 3:33

 12" single
A. "Rebel Run" (Willcox, Darlow) – 3:13
B1. "To the Mountains High" (Willcox, Bogen, Darlow) – 3:33
B2. "Baptised in Fire" (Willcox) – 2:46

Personnel
 Toyah Willcox – vocals
 Joel Bogen – guitar
 Brad Lang – bass
 Andy Duncan – drums
 Simon Darlow – keyboards

Charts

References

External links
 Lyrics of this song at Genius
 Official audio stream on YouTube
 The official Toyah website

1983 songs
1983 singles
Toyah (band) songs
Songs written by Toyah Willcox
Safari Records singles